Shingletown is a census-designated place (CDP) in Shasta County, California, United States. Its population is 2,442 as of the 2020 census, up from 2,283 from the 2010 census.

Shingletown is a small town located along California State Route 44 in the hills just below Mount Lassen.  Shingletown has a history of logging large timber, including pine, fir and cedar.  It is also known as "The Gateway to Lassen".

Shingletown was originally named Shingle Camp, for the workers who cut roofing slats from timber to supply miners during the Gold Rush era.

Geography
Shingletown is located at  (40.496033, -121.863657) in Northern California, near Lassen Volcanic National Park.

The forests around Shingletown are home to the Shasta clarkia a rare subspecies of Clarkia borealis, a flowering plant in the evening primrose family.

Fire hazard 
As of 2019, the state of California classifies the entire population of Shingletown as living in a "Very High fire Hazard Severity Zone". Cal Fire plans to trim 1,124 acres of vegetation along Highway 44, the main road through the town, as the highest priority fire safety project in the state.

Demographics

2010
The 2010 United States Census reported that Shingletown had a population of 2,283. The racial makeup of Shingletown was 2,124 (93.0%) White, 5 (0.2%) African American, 49 (2.1%) Native American, 8 (0.4%) Asian, 1 (0.0%) Pacific Islander, 13 (0.6%) from other races, and 83 (3.6%) from two or more races. Hispanic or Latino of any race were 86 persons (3.8%).

The Census reported that 2,283 people (100% of the population) lived in households, 0 (0%) lived in non-institutionalized group quarters, and 0 (0%) were institutionalized.

There were 1,007 households, out of which 188 (18.7%) had children under the age of 18 living in them, 553 (54.9%) were opposite-sex married couples living together, 76 (7.5%) had a female householder with no husband present, 40 (4.0%) had a male householder with no wife present.  There were 62 (6.2%) unmarried opposite-sex partnerships, and 7 (0.7%) same-sex married couples or partnerships. 267 households (26.5%) were made up of individuals, and 121 (12.0%) had someone living alone who was 65 years of age or older. The average household size was 2.27.  There were 669 families (66.4% of all households); the average family size was 2.70.

The population was spread out, with 358 people (15.7%) under the age of 18, 124 people (5.4%) aged 18 to 24, 359 people (15.7%) aged 25 to 44, 881 people (38.6%) aged 45 to 64, and 561 people (24.6%) who were 65 years of age or older.  The median age was 53.2 years. For every 100 females, there were 101.7 males.  For every 100 females age 18 and over, there were 99.5 males.

The homeowner vacancy rate was 4.1%; the rental vacancy rate was 13.3%.  1,868 people (81.8% of the population) lived in owner-occupied housing units and 415 people (18.2%) lived in rental housing units.

2000
As of the census of 2000, there were 2,222 people, 913 households, and 677 families residing in the CDP. The racial makeup of the CDP was 92.84% White, 2.39% Native American, 0.36% African American, 0.27% Asian, 0.77% from other races, and 3.38% from two or more races. Hispanic or Latino of any race were 3.42% of the population.

There were 913 households, out of which 26.8% had children under the age of 18 living with them, 62.3% were married couples living together, 7.9% had a female householder with no husband present, and 25.8% were non-families. 21.7% of all households were made up of individuals, and 9.0% had someone living alone who was 65 years of age or older.  The average household size was 2.43 and the average family size was 2.80.

In the CDP, the population was spread out, with 23.1% under the age of 18, 4.0% from 18 to 24, 21.2% from 25 to 44, 29.0% from 45 to 64, and 22.6% who were 65 years of age or older.  The median age was 46 years. For every 100 females, there were 101.8 males.  For every 100 females age 18 and over, there were 98.4 males.

The median income for a household in the CDP was $32,813, and the median income for a family was $40,789. Males had a median income of $50,000 versus $26,758 for females. The per capita income for the CDP was $16,303. About 10.3% of families and 12.6% of the population were below the poverty line, including 14.0% of those under age 18 and 6.2% of those age 65 or over.

Politics

Economy
Shingletown is home to KRDG and KKXS, two radio stations targeting Redding and the surrounding area.

Shingletown Airport

Shingletown had a public-use airport 
 located three miles (5 km) northeast of town. Effective October 1, 2002, the airport was closed indefinitely due to the decayed condition of the unmaintained runway and surrounding area.

In 2009 due to locals using the closed runway as a drag racing strip, the asphalt was removed. The county of Shasta has abandoned its year to year lease of the land and has surrendered it FAA airport permit for the site.

Education
There are two schools in Shingletown; Black Butte Elementary and Black Butte Junior High School located on Ponderosa Way.

As of the 2010-2011 school year, Shingletown high schoolers attend Foothill High School in Palo Cedro,  from Shingletown.

Notable people
Greg Cadaret, former professional baseball player
Lynsi Snyder, owner of In-N-Out Burger

References

External links
Regional Traffic Cameras & Road Weather Information (including Shingletown) from Caltrans
Shingletown quadrangle (USGS 7.5min map) from the state of California's Cal-Atlas website

Census-designated places in Shasta County, California
Census-designated places in California